José Augusto Alves Roçadas (Vila Real, 6 April 1865 – Lisbon, 28 April 1926) was an officer of the Portuguese Army and a colonial administrator.

In 1907 troops under his command in Portuguese Angola put down a revolt by the Ovambo at the Battle of Mufilo.

As a colonial administrator, Alves Roçadas served as Governor of the District of Huíla in Portuguese Angola (1905 - 1908), Governor of Macau (1908-1909) and Governor-General of Angola (1909-1910).

During World War I, Alves Roçadas served as the commanding officer of Portuguese forces in southern Angola, leading them in combat in the German invasion of Portuguese Africa against the invading German forces.

After the war, he participated in the preparation of the 28 May 1926 coup d'état, together with Generals Manuel Gomes da Costa, Sinel de Cordes and Óscar Carmona, thus creating the Ditadura Nacional. First destined to take up a post in the new government, he fell ill and died a month before the coup.

Notes

References
Hew Strachan, The First World War in Africa (2004) 

Portuguese colonial governors and administrators
Portuguese generals
1865 births
1926 deaths
Governors of Macau
1900s in Macau
Governors of Portuguese Angola
1900s in Angola
1910s in Angola
People from Vila Real, Portugal
Portuguese military personnel of World War I
20th-century Portuguese politicians
Portuguese revolutionaries